Greg Long may refer to:

 Greg Long (singer)  (born 1966), contemporary Christian music singer and member of Avalon
 Greg Long (surfer) (born 1984), American surfer from San Clemente, California

See also
 Gregory Long